Live in Japan is a 1973 release  by the rock supergroup power trio Beck, Bogert & Appice. The album, although initially called Beck, Bogert & Appice Live, was only issued in Japan and is also known as Live in Japan. It is generally considered rare due to the fact of it being manufactured in only limited numbers in Japan. Live in Japan was the last LP by Beck, Bogert & Appice and their only live album. Within months of the album's release the band would dissolve after Jeff Beck suddenly decided to leave.

On this record, Beck can be heard heavily using a Heil Talkbox, two years before the release of Peter Frampton's landmark album, Frampton Comes Alive! (1976). The album also contains renditions of songs originally recorded by the Jeff Beck Group, "Plynth", "Going Down", and "Morning Dew" and one Yardbirds number "Jeff's Boogie".

Track listing

1973 Original LP

40th Anniversary Edition

Personnel 
 Jeff Beck – guitar, talkbox; lead vocals (track 8)
 Tim Bogert – bass, vocals; lead vocals (tracks 1, 7, 10, 11, 12)
 Carmine Appice – drums, vocals; lead vocals (tracks 2, 3, 4, 5, 6, 12)

References

External links 
 Beck, Bogert & Appice - Beck, Bogert & Appice Live (1972) album review by Stephen Thomas Erlewine, credits & releases at AllMusic
 Beck, Bogert & Appice - Beck, Bogert & Appice Live (1973) album releases & credits at Discogs
 Beck, Bogert & Appice - Live in Japan (1973) album credits & user reviews at ProgArchives.com

Beck, Bogert & Appice albums
1973 live albums
Epic Records live albums